Kabwe Warriors is a Zambian football club based in Kabwe that plays in the Zambian Premier League. They play their home games at Railway Stadium in Kabwe.

They are the second most successful club in Zambia in terms of trophies won, only behind Mufulira Wanderers, but have not won the league title since 1987.

The club is sponsored by Zambia Railways.

History
The club was founded as Broken Hill United but changed their name to Kabwe Warriors in 1966.

Warriors won their first league title in 1968 on goal difference after Ndola United, who was leading the table entering the final round, lost 2-1 on the last day of the season.

In 1971 Kabwe Warriors became the first Zambian side to play in now CAF Champions League,but the team performed badly. In 1972, however, the warriors represented Zambia in continental football competition and reached the quarter finals. 
Warriors lost in the quarter finals to Ghana('s) Accra Hearts of Oak via a 3-9 goal aggregate.

Zambian football great Godfrey Chitalu who is the club's all time leading scorer is regarded as the club's greatest player. He played for the club between 1971 and 1982. In 1972 he scored 107 goals in all competitions for club and country; more than Lionel Messi's officially recognized record set in 2012.

In the 2013/14 season, Kabwe Warriors was relegated, but the club returned to the top flight after a one-year absence, winning promotion with five games left to play in the Division One North.

Achievements
Zambian Premier League: 5
1968, 1971, 1972, 1973, 1987

Zambian Cup: 5
1967, 1969, 1972, 1984, 1987

Zambian Challenge Cup: 8
1970, 1972, 1989, 1991, 2002, 2003, 2005, 2007

Zambian Coca-Cola Cup: 1
2006

Performance in CAF competitions
 African Cup of Champions Clubs: 3 appearances
1972: Quarter-Finals
1973: Quarter-Finals
1988: Second Round
1991: Second Round

CAF Cup: 3 appearances
1996 – First Round
1997 – Second Round
2002 – First Round

CAF Cup Winners' Cup: 3 appearances
1992 – Second Round
1993 – First Round
1995 – Second Round

References

 
Football clubs in Zambia
Kabwe